Shoot was a 1971 performance by Chris Burden in which he arranged to have himself non-lethally shot. It is the artist's most infamous performance.

Description 

On November 19, 1971, at the F-Space gallery in Santa Ana, California, a friend raised a .22-caliber rifle at a distance of 15 feet from the artist Chris Burden and shot his left shoulder. The performance was documented in an eight-second video on 16mm film and photographs. There was a small audience for the performance, including the videographer and photographer. The work was later presented through documentary photographs and text from Burden.

Analysis 

Burden has said that the performance came from the common folklore and televisual motif of getting shot in America, whether real or faked, without knowing how it actually felt. The performance was then to feel what he only experienced visually. Additionally, themes from the Vietnam War were frequent on American television news during the time of the performance.

Burden displayed a high degree of control in the work's presentation. In the artist's self-published documentation of the work, the relics of the performance and its text are terse and leave the reader to imply the performance's narrative. Burden himself referred to the photographs as symbols.

Commentators have also noted the role of non-intervention on the part of the performance's attendees, that in a bystander effect, no one contested the potentially deadly action.

Legacy 

Shoot is Burden's most infamous work. With Shoot and his later work, Burden pioneered the use of deadly risk as artistic expression. It made him known as "the artist who shot himself", even though this is technically false. As a critic in X-TRA put it, Shoot primary medium is rumor.

Artist Laurie Anderson's 1976 song, "It's Not the Bullet that Kills You (It's the Hole)", is in reference to Burden's performance.

The performance spawned multiple reproductions. In 1999, an Israeli artist painted Burden after Shoot based on an image in Lucy Lippard's 1973 Six Years: The Dematerialization of the Art Object. Tom LaDuke's 2004 Self-Inflicted Burden is a three-foot self-portrait sculpture modeled after Burden after Shoot. UCLA art student Joe Deutch simulated Russian roulette with what appeared to be a loaded weapon in a 2004 performance class. Burden spurred an ensuing media controversy comparatively larger than Shoot by resigning his teaching post at the university, blaming the university's inaction against a hostile work environment, and likening the work to domestic terrorism. Burden later said that the offshoot work was meant to co-opt, demean, and parody his own. Burden's retirement in reaction to Deutch's performance assured that the work would be remembered in connection with Shoot.

References

Bibliography

Further reading

External links 

 Documentation of Selected Works 1971–74 at Electronic Arts Intermix

November 1971 events in the United States
Performances
Works by Chris Burden
Video art